Park Ridge is the name of several locations:

Australia 
Park Ridge, Queensland, a suburb in the City of Logan
Park Ridge South, Queensland, a suburb in the City of Logan

United States 
Park Ridge, Illinois
Park Ridge, New Jersey
Park Ridge, Wisconsin